Peter Ellis (born 12 December 1976) is a former professional rugby league footballer who played for the St. George Illawarra Dragons and Eastern Suburbs.

References

Australian rugby league players
St. George Illawarra Dragons players
Sydney Roosters players
Living people
1976 births
Rugby league second-rows
Rugby league props
Place of birth missing (living people)